Since the early 2000s, a number of proposals have been made by politicians and interest groups in Galway to introduce a light rail system in the city.  No light rail proposal for the city has received any government support to date.

Corrib Light Rail (2006)
The Corrib Light Rail was the name given to a light rail proposal made in 2006.

Gluas (2008)
Gluas (the Irish word for "movement", and a pun on "Galway" + "Luas") is a proposed tram or light rail system for Galway city, similar to the Luas found in Dublin. It has been proposed by a Galway-based lobby group. There are three proposed routes for the Gluas:

Line 1: Ballybrit -> Mervue -> Wellpark -> Eyre Square -> Nun's Island -> Newcastle -> Dangan -> Rahoon
Line 2: Eyre Square -> Newcastle -> Shantalla -> Taylors Hill -> Barna
Line 3: Murrouoh -> Renmore -> Wellpark -> Terryland -> Newcastle -> Shantalla -> Taylors Hill

A fourth line is proposed for the future, when the Gluas has been established:

Line 4:  Eyre Square -> Claddagh -> Salthill -> Knocknacarra

The original proposal of three lines would require the construction of 64 stations, with park and ride facilities at Knocknacarra and Dangan.

At the time the project was proposed in June 2008, it was suggested that it would be completed within three years.  In 2015, backers of the project once again appealed to the city council to consider funding the project. Calls were renewed in 2017 at local and national levels.

SUIG (2014)
Sólás Uirbeach Iarnrod na Gaillimhe (Comfort Urban Rail of Galway) (SUIG) was a third and separate proposal made in 2014.

Gluas (2021)
In April 2021 the Gluas Group held a very well attended webinar in which Minister for Transport Eamon Ryan announced a feasibility study on Light Rail for 2022.

References

External links
 Gluas.ie – Local website supporting Gluas, archived by Wayback Machine

Light rail in Ireland
Tram transport in the Republic of Ireland
Transport in Galway (city)
Proposed railway lines in the Republic of Ireland